Robert Lloyd Hall-Thompson TD (9 April 1920 – 20 May 1992), known as Lloyd Hall-Thompson, was a Unionist politician in Northern Ireland.

Born in Belfast, Hall-Thompson was the son of Samuel Hall-Thompson, and grandson of Rt. Hon. Robert Thompson MP.  He studied at Campbell College in Belfast and joined the Ulster Unionist Party (UUP) in 1938.  He was commissioned into the 8th Anti-Aircraft Regiment, Royal Artillery in 1939 and served during World War II, reaching the rank of Captain.  For ten years from 1946, he served in the Territorial Army, reaching the rank of Major.

Hall-Thompson was elected to the Parliament of Northern Ireland at the 1969 election, representing Belfast Clifton.  He won as an independent Unionist, supporting Prime Minister of Northern Ireland Terence O'Neill.  In September 1970, he rejoined the UUP.

Following the abolition of the Parliament, Hall-Thompson was elected to the 1973 Northern Ireland Assembly for Belfast North, representing the UUP.  The following year, he became the leader of the Assembly and also the Executive's Chief Whip, before joining the Unionist Party of Northern Ireland.  Under this new party designation, he was elected to the Northern Ireland Constitutional Convention of 1975.

Outside politics, Hall-Thompson was involved in horse breeding.

Late in life, Hall-Thompson joined the Conservative Party, and in 1988 he became the Chair of the Lagan Valley Conservative Association.

References

1920 births
1992 deaths
Politicians from Belfast
People educated at Campbell College
Royal Artillery officers
Members of the House of Commons of Northern Ireland 1969–1973
Members of the Northern Ireland Assembly 1973–1974
Members of the Northern Ireland Constitutional Convention
Independent members of the House of Commons of Northern Ireland
Ulster Unionist Party members of the House of Commons of Northern Ireland
Unionist Party of Northern Ireland politicians
British Army personnel of World War II
Members of the House of Commons of Northern Ireland for Belfast constituencies
Junior ministers of the 1974 Northern Ireland Assembly